Rasipuram Krishnaswami Laxman (24 October 1921 – 26 January 2015) was an Indian cartoonist, illustrator, and humorist. He is best known for his creation The Common Man and for his daily cartoon strip, You Said It in The Times of India, which started in 1951.

R. K. Laxman started his career as a part-time cartoonist, working mostly for local newspapers and magazines. While as a college student, he illustrated his older brother R. K. Narayan's stories in The Hindu. His first full-time job was as a political cartoonist for The Free Press Journal in Mumbai. Later, he joined The Times of India, and became famous for The Common Man character, which turned out to be the turning point in Laxman's life.

Birth and childhood
R. K. Laxman was born in Mysore in 1921in a Tamil Hindu brahmin family. His father was a headmaster and Laxman was the youngest of eight children: six sons and two daughters. His elder brother was renowned novelist R.K. Narayan. Laxman was known as "Pied Piper of Delhi".

Laxman was engrossed by the illustrations in magazines such as The Strand, Punch, Bystander, Wide World and Tit-Bits, before he had even begun to read. Soon he was drawing on his own, on the floors, walls and doors of his house and doodling caricatures of his teachers at school; praised by a teacher for his drawing of a peepal leaf, he began to think of himself as an artist in the making. Another early influence on Laxman was the work of the world-renowned British cartoonist, Sir David Low (whose signature he misread as "cow" for a long time) that appeared now and then in The Hindu. Laxman notes in his autobiography, The Tunnel of Time:

Laxman was the captain of his local "Rough and Tough and Jolly" cricket team and his antics inspired the stories "Dodu the Money Maker" and "The Regal Cricket Club" written by his brother, Narayan. Laxman's idyllic childhood was shaken for a while when his father suffered a paralytic stroke and died around a year later, but the elders at home bore most of the increased responsibility, while Laxman continued with his schooling.

After high school Maharaja's Govt. High School, Mysore, Laxman applied to the Sir J.J. Institute of Applied Art hoping to concentrate on his lifelong interests of drawing and painting, but the dean of the school wrote to him that his drawings lacked "the kind of talent to qualify for enrolment in our institution as a student", and refused admission. He finally graduated with a Bachelor of Arts from the University of Mysore. In the meantime he continued his freelance artistic activities and contributed cartoons to Swarajya and an animated film based on the mythological character Narada.

Career

Beginning
R.K Laxman's earliest work was for newspapers Rohan and magazines including Swarajya and Blitz. While still at the Maharaja College of Mysore, he began to illustrate his elder brother R. K. Narayan's stories in The Hindu, and he drew political cartoons for the local newspapers and for the Swatantra. Laxman also drew cartoons for the Kannada humour magazine, Koravanji which was founded in 1942 by Dr M. Shivaram who had a clinic in the Majestic area of Bangalore. He started this monthly magazine, dedicating it to humorous and satirical articles and cartoons. Shivaram himself was an eminent humourist in Kannada. He encouraged Laxman.

Laxman held a summer job at the Gemini Studios, Madras.  His first full-time job was as a political cartoonist for The Free Press Journal in Mumbai, where Bal Thackeray was his cartoonist colleague. In 1951, Laxman joined The Times of India, Mumbai, beginning a career that spanned over fifty years. His "Common Man" character, featured in his pocket cartoons, is portrayed as a witness to the making of democracy. Anthropologist Ritu G. Khanduri notes, "R. K. Laxman structures his cartoon-news through a plot about corruption and a set of characters. This news is visualized and circulates through the recurring figures of the mantri (minister), the Common Man and the trope of modernity symbolized by the airplane (2012: 304)."

Other creations
Laxman also created a popular mascot for the Asian Paints Ltd group called "Gattu" in 1954. He also wrote a few novels, the first one of which was titled The Hotel Riviera. His cartoons have appeared in Hindi films such as Mr. & Mrs. '55 and a Tamil film Kamaraj. His creations also include the sketches drawn for the television adaptation of Malgudi Days which was written by his elder brother R. K. Narayan, directed by Shankar Nag, and a Konkan coast based Hindi sitcom, Wagle Ki Duniya. Laxman also drew caricatures of David Low, T.S. Eliot, Bertrand Russell, J.B. Priestly and Graham Greene.

Personal life
Laxman was first married to Kumari Kamala, a Bharatanatyam dancer and film actress who began her film career as a child actress named "Baby Kamala" and graduated into adult roles under the name "Kumari Kamala" ("Miss Kamala"). They had no children and after their divorce in 1960 Laxman married his niece whose first name was again Kamala. She was the author and children's book writer Kamala Laxman. In a cartoon series named "The star I never met" in film magazine Filmfare he painted a cartoon of Kamala Laxman, with the title "The star I only met!" The couple had a son Srinivas, who worked for a while with The Times of India too.

In September 2003, Laxman suffered a stroke that left him paralysed on his left side. He recovered from it partially. On the evening of 20 June 2010, Laxman was admitted to Breach Candy Hospital in Mumbai after being transported by an air ambulance from Pune.

Death
Laxman died in Deenanath Mangeshkar Hospital in Pune on India's Republic Day in 2015 at the age of 93. He was hospitalised three days earlier for a urinary tract infection and chest problems that ultimately led to multiple organ failure. He had reportedly suffered multiple strokes since 2010.A cartoon that Laxman had made following the successful landing of Mangalyaan on Mars was posted by the Indian Space Research Organisation on its Facebook and Twitter pages on 27 January. Maharashtra Chief Minister Devendra Fadnavis announced that Laxman would be accorded a state funeral and a memorial would be built in his honour. Laxman's body was kept at the Symbiosis Institute's Pune premises near the "Common Man" statue and his body was cremated at the Vaikunth crematorium.

Awards and recognition
Padma Bhushan – Govt. of India – 1973
Padma Vibhushan – Govt. of India – 2005
Ramon Magsaysay Award for Journalism, Literature and Creative Communication Arts – 1984
Karnataka Rajyotsava Award – Government of Karnataka – 1983
Lifetime Achievement Award for Journalism – CNN IBN TV18 – 29 January 2008
Pune Pandit Award (Scholar of Pune Award) by the Art & Music Foundation for excellence in 'Creative Communication' – 2012
Honorary Doctorate from the University of Mysore – 2004

There is a chair named after R. K. Laxman at Symbiosis International University.

Exhibitions by IIC 
Exhibitions of Laxman's cartoons organised by Indian Institute of Cartoonists at Indian Cartoon Gallery.

Popular culture
 Actor Asif Ali Beg portrayed R.K.Laxman in Scam 1992, a Sony LIV's original web series based on 1992 Indian stock market scam of Harshad Mehta, where he was shown to be interacting with journalist Sucheta Dalal while working for the Times of India, Mumbai.
On 24 October 2015, Google featured Laxman on a Google Doodle to honour him on the occasion of his  94th birthday.

Bibliography
 
 
 
 
 
 
 
 
 
 
 
 
 
 His autobiography Lakshmanrekha is published in Marathi.
 The Reel World [cartoons] published by Marwah Studio.
 
 
 
 
 
 
 
 
 
 
 
 
 
 
 
 
 
 
 
 
 
 
 
 
 
 
 
 Unny, E.P. (2022). RK Laxman: Back with a Punch. Niyogi Books. ISBN 978-93-91125-27-1.

(He also wrote a book named Banker Margiah in Kannada to create awareness about Banking, about how to open a bank account by a common man. Later a movie was reseased. Which was awarded National Award as well.).

Multimedia
India Through The Eyes of R. K. Laxman – Then To Now (CD-ROM).
R K Laxman Ki Duniya, a television show on SAB TV.
Wagle Ki Duniya, a television show on DD National.

References

External links

Documentary by Films Division of India on YouTube
Audio-visual presentation by Sansad TV on YouTube (in Hindi)
Interview with Karan Thapar for the BBC show Face to Face on YouTube

1921 births
2015 deaths
Indian cartoonists
Writers from Mysore
Indian editorial cartoonists
The Times of India journalists
Ramon Magsaysay Award winners
Maharaja's College, Mysore alumni
Recipients of the Padma Bhushan in arts
Recipients of the Padma Vibhushan in arts
Deaths from multiple organ failure
20th-century Indian journalists
Journalists from Karnataka
Artists from Mysore
20th-century Indian painters